A diverterless supersonic inlet (DSI) is a type of jet engine air intake used by some modern combat aircraft to control air flow into their engines. It consists of a "bump" and a forward-swept inlet cowl, which work together to divert boundary layer airflow away from the aircraft's engine. This eliminates the need for a splitter plate, while compressing the air to slow it down from supersonic to subsonic speeds. The DSI can be used to replace conventional methods of controlling supersonic and boundary-layer airflow.

DSIs can be used to replace the intake ramp and inlet cone, which are more complex, heavy and expensive.

Technical background 
The fundamental design of a gas turbine engine is such that the air flow-rate entering its compressor is regulated by the amount of fuel burned in its combustor. For supersonic flight the air entering the inlet also has to be regulated to a similar amount by the design of the entrance of the inlet duct (to minimize either drag, on the one hand, or unstable shock position (manifested by "buzz") on the other). Flow trying to enter the inlet which doesn't match what is allowed to enter the compressor is caused by changes in engine airflow (from  thrust lever movements) being unable to communicate (at the speed of sound) with the air in front of the inlet.

Inlets 

On supersonic jets, the high kinetic energy in the approaching air has to be transformed into static pressure while losing a minimum amount of energy. To do this the inlets are more complicated than subsonic ones as they have to set up two or three shock waves to compress the air. A cone or inclined ramp protrudes ahead of the inlet. The complexity of these inlets increases with increase in design speed.

Diverterless inlets 
The DSI bump functions as a compression surface and creates a pressure distribution that prevents the majority of the boundary layer air from entering the inlet at speeds up to Mach 2. In essence, the DSI does away with complex and heavy mechanical systems.

History 
Initial research into the DSI was done by Antonio Ferri in the 1950s, and further developed & optimized by Lockheed Martin in the early 1990s using computational fluid dynamics. The first Lockheed DSI was flown on 11 December 1996 as part of a Technology Demonstration project. It was installed on an F-16 Block 30 fighter, replacing the aircraft's original intake diverter. The modified F-16 demonstrated a maximum speed of Mach 2.0 (Mach 2.0 is the F-16's clean certified maximum speed) and handling characteristics similar to a normal F-16. It was also shown that subsonic specific excess power was slightly improved.

The DSI concept was introduced into the JAST/JSF program as a trade study item in mid-1994. It was compared with a traditional "caret" style inlet. The trade studies involved additional CFD, testing, and weight and cost analyses.

A DSI was incorporated into the design of the Lockheed Martin F-35 Lightning II in 2000 after proving to be 30% lighter and showing lower production and maintenance costs over traditional inlets while still meeting all performance requirements.

Benefits

Weight and complexity reduction 
Traditional aircraft inlets contain many heavy moving parts. In comparison, DSI eliminates all moving parts, which makes it far less complex and more reliable than earlier diverter-plate inlets. The removal of moving parts also reduces the weight of the aircraft.

Stealth 

DSIs improve the aircraft's very-low-observable characteristics by eliminating radar reflections between the diverter and the aircraft's skin. Additionally, the "bump" surface reduces the engine's exposure to radar, significantly reducing a strong source of radar reflection because they provide an additional shielding of engine fans against radar waves.

Analysts have noted that the DSI reduces the need for application of radar-absorbent materials in reducing frontal radar cross section of the aircraft.

List of aircraft with DSI

Active 

 CAC/PAC JF-17 Thunder
 Chengdu J-10B/C
 Chengdu J-20
 Guizhou JL-9G
 Lockheed Martin F-35 Lightning II
 Shenyang FC-31

Future 

HAL AMCA
HAL TEDBF
Sukhoi Su-75 Checkmate
Next Generation Fighter (NGF)
Tempest 
F/A-XX (US)
Next Generation Air Dominance Fighter (US)

References

External links

  "JSF Diverterless Supersonic Inlet" - Code One magazine, Lockheed Martin
 https://web.archive.org/web/20091124032509/http://www.codeonemagazine.com/archives/2000/articles/july_00/divertless_1.html
 University presentation on JSF Program
 F-35 Technology page 

Aircraft propulsion components